Roukoz is a surname. Notable people with the surname include:

Chamel Roukoz (born 1962), Lebanese brigadier general
Roukoz Roukoz, Lebanese judoka

Arabic-language surnames